Bryan Davies, Baron Davies of Oldham, PC (born 9 November 1939) is a Labour member of the House of Lords. He served as Government Deputy Chief Whip in the House of Lords from 2003 to 2010, and as usual for a holder of that position, also held the position of Captain of the Yeomen of the Guard.

Early life and education
He was educated at Redditch County High School, Worcestershire, at University College London, graduating with a Bachelor of Arts in history 1961, the Institute of Education (PGCE 1962) and at the London School of Economics, graduating with a Bachelor of Science in economics in 1968.

He worked as a history teacher at The Latymer School from 1962 to 1965 and as a history and social science lecturer at Middlesex Polytechnic, Enfield from 1965 to 1974, during which time he served as a trade union official in the National Association for Teachers in Further and Higher Education (NATFHE). He has been a member of the Transport and General Workers Union since 1979.

Political career
He was Member of Parliament (MP) for Enfield North from February 1974 until he lost the seat in 1979 to the Conservative Tim Eggar. Davies later served as MP for Oldham Central and Royton from 1992 until the seat was abolished by boundary changes in 1997. He was defeated for the Labour selection in the new constituency of Oldham West and Royton by Michael Meacher (then incumbent MP for the old seat of Oldham West). He had also fought Central Norfolk in 1966 and Newport West in 1983.

On 3 October 1997 Davies was created a life peer as Baron Davies of Oldham, of Broxbourne in the County of Hertfordshire.

He served as Secretary to the Parliamentary Labour Party and Shadow Cabinet from 1979 until 1992. He also served as a member of the Medical Research Council from 1977 to 1979 and chaired the Further Education Funding Council from 1998 until 2000. In 2006, he was appointed to the Privy Council.

References

External links 
 

Davies, Bryan, Baron
Davies, Bryan, Baron
Davies of Oldham, Bryan, Baron
Davies of Oldham, Bryan, Baron
Davies of Oldham, Bryan, Baron
Davies of Oldham
Life peers created by Elizabeth II
Labour Party (UK) Baronesses- and Lords-in-Waiting
Davies, Bryan, Baron
Davies of Oldham, Bryan, Baron
Labour Party (UK) MPs for English constituencies
UK MPs 1974
UK MPs 1974–1979
UK MPs 1992–1997
Politics of the Metropolitan Borough of Oldham